Józef Joniec (12 October 1959 in Laskowa – 10 April 2010) was a Polish Roman Catholic priest.

Biography
He made his first religious profession in the Piarist Order on August 16, 1977, accepting St. Krzysztof. He was ordained a priest on May 18, 1985, by Bishop Władysław Miziołek.  After receiving ordination, he took up service in Kraków, Hebdów and from 1990 in Warsaw as a rector of the Piarist College.

He died in the 2010 Polish Air Force Tu-154 crash near Smolensk on 10 April 2010. He was posthumously awarded the Order of Polonia Restituta.

References

1959 births
2010 deaths
Polish Roman Catholic priests
Knights of the Order of Polonia Restituta
Officers of the Order of Polonia Restituta
Recipients of the Silver Cross of Merit (Poland)
Recipients of the Gold Cross of Merit (Poland)
Victims of the Smolensk air disaster
People from Limanowa County